Widner Township is one of ten townships in Knox County, Indiana. As of the 2010 census, its population was 1,132 and it contained 506 housing units.

History
Widner Township was named for John Widner, a pioneer settler.

Kixmiller's Store at Freedlandville was added to the National Register of Historic Places in 1978.

Geography

References

Townships in Knox County, Indiana
Townships in Indiana